New Jersey Drive, Vol. 1 (Original Motion Picture Soundtrack) is the first of two soundtracks to Nick Gomez' 1995 film New Jersey Drive. It was released on March 28, 1995 through Tommy Boy Records, and consists of hip hop music. Composed of seventeen songs, the album features performances by Blak Panta, Coolio, Heavy D, Ill Al Skratch, Keith Murray, Mac Mall, Maze, MC Eiht, Lords of the Underground, Notorious B.I.G., Outkast, Poets of Darkness, Queen Latifah, Ray Luv, Redman, Sabelle, Smooth, Total, Undacova, and Young Lay. Production was handled by several hip hop's top producers, including Puff Daddy, Erick Sermon, Easy Mo Bee and Marley Marl.

The album found a great deal of success, making it to #22 on the Billboard 200 and #3 on the Top R&B/Hip-Hop Albums, and spawned the certified gold single "Can't You See" which launched the career of popular 90's girl group Total. On June 6, 1995 the soundtrack was certified gold by the RIAA.

New Jersey Drive, Vol. 2 was released on April 11, 1995.

Track listing

Charts

Weekly charts

Year-end charts

References

External links

1995 soundtrack albums
Hip hop soundtracks
Tommy Boy Records soundtracks
Albums produced by MC Eiht
Albums produced by Sean Combs
Albums produced by Easy Mo Bee
Albums produced by Marley Marl
Albums produced by Erick Sermon
Albums produced by Organized Noize
Drama film soundtracks
Crime film soundtracks